Marco Vinicio Cerezo Arévalo (born 26 December 1942) is a Guatemalan politician and the current Secretary General of the Central American Integration System (SICA). He served as President of Guatemala from 14 January 1986 to 14 January 1991.

Career
Cerezo was born in Guatemala City, the son  of the Supreme Court judge Marco Vinicio Cerezo Sierra, and came from a well-known liberal family. In 1962 he was a member of the student body of the Universidad de San Carlos de Guatemala (USAC) that played an important part in the national protests against the government of Miguel Ydígoras. In 1964 he joined the Guatemalan Christian Democrats (DCG), a party that was banned from standing in the 1966 elections. He graduated in Judicial science from USAC in 1968, the same year in which the DCG was formally legalized, and was made its Secretary in 1970. From that time, and with a very tense political situation, Cerezo was forced to hire permanent protection. In February 1981, in the worst of 3 assassination attempts, his vehicle was attacked with hand grenades and machine gun fire in the center of the capital.

In 1974 the DCG formed part of the coalition that backed General Efraín Ríos Montt for president. Amidst allegations of fraud Ríos Montt lost to Kjell Eugenio Laugerud. Cerezo was elected a deputy in the National Congress where the DCG, with 14 seats, became the largest party within the opposition.

In 1978 General Ricardo Peralta Méndez, the DCG candidate came second to Fernando Romeo Lucas García. During the Lucas García era 150 members of the DCG were murdered. The three surviving members of the Congress and the party were forced into hiding, not because of a ban but in fear of their lives. Yet Cerezo appeared at the March 1982 elections to support the opposition candidate Alejandro Maldonado Aguirre who lost out to the official candidate Ángel Aníbal Guevara. Suspecting fraud Maldonado and Cerezo and their followers launched a campaign denouncing the result. The result became academic when Efraín Ríos Montt took power in a coup, which the DCG and Cerezo initially supported. When it became clear that the repression in the countryside was becoming more indiscriminate, and, perhaps more importantly, that Ríos Montt was fanatically preaching an evangelical, messianic born again type of Christianity, Cerezo withdrew his support for the regime and demanded new elections. In 1983 General Óscar Humberto Mejía took power in another coup, which Cerezo cautiously supported. The DCG gained 21.2% of the vote in the 1984 National Congress elections, and with 20 of the 88 seats was the largest party. With this success behind them the DCG decided to postulate Cerezo for the 1985 presidential election. He began to promote the idea of talking to the United Guatemalan National Revolutionaries (URNG), an umbrella group containing the main three guerrilla groups.

President (1986–1991)

In the first round of the 1985 presidential elections on 3 November, Cerezo came first with 38.6% of the popular vote, and in the second round on 8 December he defeated Jorge Carpio with 68.4% of the vote. The DCG gained 51 of the 100 seats in conference, and also gained a majority in many municipalities across the country. He was both the first democratically elected president and the first civilian to take office since 1966. In his inauguration, which was met with great hopes amongst the population, he promised to ensure that what he called the dark forces of the right would not be able to break the public order or the state. He promised to change Guatemala within his first 126 days. Some of his first actions as president were to force army chief of staff and suspected human rights abuser Rodolfo Lobos Zamora to retire from the military, and to name Jaime Hernández Méndez as Minister of Defence, in what was described as a "test of wills" with the Army.

The response was a new wave of terror, with many extrajudicial killings being committed by Guatemalan security forces. This battle against the forces of terror operating in the country was to be the dominant theme of his rule. According to NGO Americas Watch in 1986, 100 people a month were dying in the conflict at that time. He declared Guatemala neutral in the civil wars that were occurring in neighboring El Salvador and Nicaragua. He was a great supporter of the idea of a Central American Parliament. There were two important conferences on Central American integration in Esquipulas—the second of which, in August 1987, established the Procedure for a firm and lasting peace, the most important milestone in re-establishing peace in the region.

On 11 September 1987, he established the National Commission for Reconciliation (CNR), and on 7 October negotiations between the URNG and the government began. When they failed two days later, with the government refusing to accept the URNG's terms, Cerezo asked the United States of America for more military aid to further the counter insurgency efforts of the armed forces. On 28 October, Congress passed a general political amnesty. Amidst rumors of plots and possible assassination attempts against Cerezo, many also began to consider him as powerless and ineffective. After a farcical attempt by two colonels to take power on 11 May 1988, on 19 May an Air force unit made a series of demands of the government, including breaking ties with pro-USSR countries and stopping any contacts with the URNG, as well as more money for better equipment and the removal of many local politicians. Cerezo admitted that he had had to submit to some of the military's demands in order to avoid a coup taking place. In August there was a three-week general strike in protest against the liberalization of petrol and other sources of fuel.

1989 saw a worsening of the political situation, with 1,600 assassinations and 800 kidnappings or disappearances in the first half of the year. These were attributed to the political violence and the covert war between suspected extrajudicial right-wing forces and the URNG. On 9 May another attempted coup failed, and though the perpetrators were sentenced to long terms in jail that November, they were released on appeal the following January. On 1 August, DCG Secretary General Danilo Barillas was assassinated, but on 25 August Cerezo came back with a new promise to renovate the public administration by consolidating democracy within the 500 days he had left as president. Guatemala has remained a democracy ever since.

In May 1990, an important agreement was signed in Madrid with the URNG in which they promised not to disturb the forthcoming elections. With this success behind him, Cerezo felt able to give a positive recapitulation of his presidency, and he was able to hand power over to his successor Jorge Serrano in the first democratic transition of power since 1951. The DCG performed poorly in the presidential elections, with its candidate, Alfonso Cabrera Hidalgo, not getting past the first round. Despite this, they still managed to win 27 seats in the National Congress.

That same year, as part of a thaw in Soviet–Guatemalan diplomatic relations, Cerezo invited the noted Russian linguist and epigrapher Yuri Knorozov to Guatemala to present him with a medal. Knorozov had been instrumental in the decipherment of Maya hieroglyphics, and this was the first opportunity for the scholar to visit the lands and sites of the former Maya civilization.

Then on 1 December, a troop of soldiers massacred 24 campesinos in Santiago Atitlán in the department of Sololá. In the resulting outcry, the US suspended military aid to Guatemala. Despite having supported the previous coups that lead to human rights abuses in the countryside, President Cerezo claims to have stopped the massacre himself.

Post-presidency
In 1991 Cerezo became a deputy in the Central American Parliament in its first five-year term. He was accused of hiding behind the immunity conferred here and in his role as ex-President in order to avoid a variety of charges, including fraud in the buying of a Jordanian island, the covering up of the murder of Myrna Mack Chang and the concession of a large piece of land to a conservation group owned by Cerezo's son Marco Vinicio Cerezo Blandón.

In the 1999 elections, the first for which the DCG did not offer a presidential candidate, Cerezo won one of the two National Congress seats gained by his party. He was re-elected to Congress for the 2004-08 period in the November 2003 election, this time as the DCG's sole deputy.

At the 2007 election Cerezo lost his seat in Congress and his party gained no seats. His son, also named Vinicio Cerezo, ran for president but received less than 1% of the vote.

Vinicio Cerezo is currently building an NGO (nongovernmental organization) named Esquipulas after Esquipulas Procedure for a firm and lasting peace and a new Esquipulas conference called Esquipulas III (to follow the previous Esquipulas I and II) to further the integration of Central America, directed by Olinda Salguero. He also is a political consultant.

His appointment as Secretary General of the Central America Integration System (SICA) was announced on 29 June 2017, during the 49th gathering in San Jose, Costa Rica. He was named Peace Ambassador by the Guatemala Government on 7 August 2017, in the anniversary of the Esquipulas II agreements.

References

External links

Biography by CIDOB (in Spanish)
Congressional web page
Crisis de Gobernabilidad 1a. Fase: Perspectiva Política, New Media, Francisco Marroquín University

Presidents of Guatemala
Members of the Congress of Guatemala
People of the Guatemalan Civil War
1942 births
Living people
People from Guatemala City
Universidad de San Carlos de Guatemala alumni
20th-century Guatemalan people
21st-century Guatemalan people
Guatemalan Christian Democracy politicians
Grand Crosses with Diamonds of the Order of the Sun of Peru
Collars of the Order of Isabella the Catholic